The International Foodservice Distributors Association (IFDA) is a trade association serving the foodservice distribution industry. Its members include foodservice distributors, foodservice manufacturers, and foodservice buying groups. Their largest membership base is from North America, but IFDA represents the industry internationally as well. IFDA traces its history to 1906 when the National Wholesale Grocers' Association (NWGA) was founded to promote food safety and represent the industry to government. In 1969, IFDA was created as a division of NAWGA to represent the specific needs of foodservice distribution. Eventually, IFDA began independent operation on January 1, 2003.

References

External links
 

Trade associations based in the United States
Organizations based in Washington, D.C.
Organizations established in 1969